Matthias Tanner is a Czech Jesuit and writer, born at Pilsen in Bohemia, 28 February 1630; died at Prague, 8 February 1692.

Biography 
Matthias Tanner entered the Society of Jesus in 1646. The greatest part of his life was spent at Prague, where he taught humanities, philosophy, theology, and Scripture, was made rector of the imperial university, and guided for six years the Bohemian province of his order.  

Not only did Tanner burn to imitate the apostles and martyrs of the society, but, to awaken in his brethren a like desire, he employed his leisure hours in recounting to them the lives and deaths of the most prominent sons of St. Ignatius. His two works, Societas Jesu ad sanguinis et vitae profusionem militans ("A history of the lives and deaths of those Jesuits who suffered martyrdom for the faith") and Societas Jesu Apostolorum imitatrix (describing the heroic deeds and virtues of the Jesuits who laboured in all parts of the world with extraordinary success for the salvation of souls) were written in this spirit. 

He paid special attention to reverence and devotion during the holy sacrifice of the Mass. According to his biographer, he used to celebrate with such living piety that he was like a lodestone, attracting the faithful to the altar where he offered the sacrifice. To foster this reverence in others, he wrote two other works, Explanation of the Bloody Sacrifice of Christ in the Unbloody Sacrifice of the Mass, which was re-edited three times, and a pamphlet proclaiming God's wrath against those who should dare to desecrate holy temples by their misbehavior. His name became more widely known through his work, Dialogus controversisticus on the validity of the Holy orders conferred on Andrew Frommens during the lifetime of his wife. 

He died in Prague on February 8, 1692.

References

1630 births
1692 deaths
17th-century German Jesuits
People from Plzeň
German Bohemian people